Abertzale Sozialista Komiteak (ASK) was a grassroots socialist and pro-self-management movement in the Basque Country. Its origins were the Herri Batzarak movement in Bizkaia.

History
In 1977 ASK extended its activity throughout all Euskal Herria, and joined the Koordinadora Abertzale Sozialista. In 1978 ASK was one of the founding parties of Herri Batasuna. In the mid 80's the party had a debate over its ideology and space in the Basque Ezker abertzalea movement, defending a direct democracy model based in municipalities and neighborhood associations, prioritizing social movements to institutions. ASK created commissions dedicated to determined social movements, including Basque language, amnesty for the Basque prisoners, feminism, ecology, anti-militarism, popular culture or the fight against drugs, among others.

ASK disappeared in 1994, fully integrating themselves in Herri Batasuna.

References

Defunct socialist parties in Spain
Basque nationalism
1976 establishments in Spain
Political parties established in 1976